The 2015 FC Ordabasy season is their 13th season in the Kazakhstan Premier League, the highest tier of association football in Kazakhstan, following their promotion from to the Kazakhstan First Division in 2003. Ordabasy will also play in the UEFA Europa League and Kazakhstan Cup.

Squad

Reserve team

Transfers

Winter

In:

Out:

Summer

In:

Out:

Competitions

Kazakhstan Premier League

First round

Results summary

Results by round

Results

League table

Championship round

Results summary

Results by round

Results

League table

Kazakhstan Cup

UEFA Europa League

Qualifying rounds

Squad statistics

Appearances and goals

|-
|colspan="14"|Players away from Ordabasy on loan:
|-
|colspan="14"|Players who appeared for Ordabasy that left during the season:
|}

Goal scorers

Disciplinary record

References

External links

Ordabasy
Ordabasy
FC Ordabasy seasons